James Aloysius Foley (June 21, 1882 in New York City – February 11, 1946 in Manhattan, New York City) was an American lawyer and politician from New York.

Life
He was the son of James Foley (1846–1919) and Anne Moran Foley (1847–1928). He graduated from the College of the City of New York in 1901; and from New York Law School in 1904.

Foley was a member of the New York State Assembly (New York Co., 12th D.) in 1907, 1908, 1909, 1910, 1911 and 1912; and was Chairman of the Committee on Affairs of Cities in 1911.

He was a member of the New York State Senate from 1913 to 1919, sitting in the 136th, 137th, 138th, 139th, 140th, 141st (all six 14th D.) and 142nd New York State Legislatures (16th D.); and was Minority Leader in 1919.

He was a member of the New York State Commission for the Panama–Pacific International Exposition in 1915.

On June 21, 1919, he married Mabel Graham Murphy (died 1954), the step-daughter of Tammany Boss Charles Francis Murphy. They had no children.

Foley was Surrogate of New York County from 1920 until his death. In 1924, after the death of his father-in-law, Foley was offered the leadership of Tammany Hall but he declined, preferring to continue on the bench.

He died on February 11, 1946, in the Harkness Pavilion of the Columbia-Presbyterian Medical Center in Manhattan, of a heart attack; and was buried at the Calvary Cemetery in Queens.

Sources
Official New York from Cleveland to Hughes by Charles Elliott Fitch (Hurd Publishing Co., New York and Buffalo, 1911, Vol. IV; pg. 354f, 357 and 359f)
State of New York at the Panama–Pacific International Exposition, San Francisco, California, 1915 (Albany, 1916; pg. 27)
MISS MABEL MURPHY WEDS SENATOR FOLEY in NYT on June 22, 1919
FOR SURROGATE: JAMES A. FOLEY in NYT on November 3, 1919
SURROGATE FOLEY DIES AT AGE OF 63 in NYT on February 12, 1946 (subscription required)

External links

1882 births
1946 deaths
Democratic Party New York (state) state senators
People from Manhattan
Democratic Party members of the New York State Assembly
New York University alumni
New York Law School alumni
New York (state) state court judges
Burials at Calvary Cemetery (Queens)
20th-century American judges
20th-century American politicians